Zafer Turan (born 9 October 1969) is a Turkish football manager.

References

1969 births
Living people
Turkish football managers
Göztepe S.K. managers
İstanbul Başakşehir F.K. non-playing staff
Eyüpspor managers